Jakob Novak (born 4 March 1998) is a Slovenian footballer who plays for FC Atyrau as a midfielder.

Club career

Novak made his professional debut in the Slovenian PrvaLiga for Olimpija Ljubljana on 18 July 2015 in a game against ND Gorica.

In February 2023, Novak joined Kazakhstan Premier League side FC Atyrau.

Honours
Olimpija Ljubljana
Slovenian PrvaLiga: 2015–16

Celje
Slovenian PrvaLiga: 2019–20

Notes

References

External links
 NZS profile 
 
 

1998 births
Living people
Slovenian footballers
Slovenian expatriate footballers
Slovenia youth international footballers
Slovenia under-21 international footballers
Association football midfielders
NK Olimpija Ljubljana (2005) players
NK Rudar Velenje players
NK Celje players
Boluspor footballers
FC Atyrau players
Slovenian PrvaLiga players
TFF First League players

Slovenian expatriate sportspeople in Turkey
Expatriate footballers in Turkey
Expatriate footballers in Kazakhstan